Leif Arve Seland (born 12 December 1963), known as Arve Seland, is a Norwegian former footballer who played as a forward. He played for IK Start, and also for the Norwegian national team. He competed at the 1984 Summer Olympics in Los Angeles.

References

External links
 

1963 births
Living people
People from Arendal
Association football defenders
Norwegian footballers
Norway international footballers
IK Start players
Eliteserien players
FC Mulhouse players
Ligue 2 players
K.F.C. Winterslag players
Footballers at the 1984 Summer Olympics
Olympic footballers of Norway
Norwegian expatriate footballers
Expatriate footballers in France
Norwegian expatriate sportspeople in France
Expatriate footballers in Belgium
Norwegian expatriate sportspeople in Belgium
Sportspeople from Agder